Zacarías Salterain-Bizkarra (1887–1957) also known as Zacarias of Saint Teresa was a Discalced Carmelite priest.

Early life
He was born on 5 November 1887 in Abadiano, Vizcaya, Spain to Bartholomew and Venancia Salterain-Bizkarra.

Religious life
Zacharias was ordained a priest on 14 September 1912. He was a missionary to India, worked to spread Catholic culture and was also a writer.

Death
He died on 28 May 1957 at the Christian Medical College Hospital in Vellore, Tamil Nadu, India. He was buried in Mangalappuzha, but on 8 June 2000, his mortal remains were moved to the Immaculate Conception Church in Manjummel.

Veneration
He was declared Venerable on 27 January 2014 by Pope Francis.

References

20th-century Spanish Roman Catholic priests
20th-century venerated Christians
Spanish venerated Catholics
Venerated Carmelites
1957 deaths
Spanish Roman Catholic missionaries
1887 births
Venerated Catholics by Pope Francis